Milltown, Ireland can refer to several places in Ireland:

In the Republic of Ireland
Milltown, County Kerry
Milltown, Dublin, a suburb of Dublin
Milltown, County Cavan
Milltown, County Galway

In Northern Ireland
Milltown, County Antrim, a village in the Lisburn City Council area of County Antrim
Milltown, Antrim Borough, a village in the Borough of Antrim
Milltown (near Maghery), a village near Maghery in the Craigavon Borough Council area of County Armagh
Milltown (near Waringstown), a village near Waringstown in the Craigavon Borough Council area of County Armagh

See also 
For places outside Ireland known as Milltown, see Milltown (disambiguation)